"On a Night Like This" is a song written by Doug Kahan and Karen Staley, and recorded by American country music group Trick Pony.  It was released in April 2001 as the second single from the album Trick Pony.  The song reached number 4 on the Billboard Hot Country Singles & Tracks chart and number 47 on the Billboard Hot 100.

Music video
The music video was directed by Peter Zavadil and premiered in early 2001.

Chart performance
"On a Night Like This" debuted at number 56 on the U.S. Billboard Country Singles & Tracks for the chart week of May 5, 2001.

Year-end charts

References

2001 singles
2001 songs
Trick Pony songs
Music videos directed by Peter Zavadil
Warner Records singles
Songs written by Karen Staley